Gerry Hussey (1933–1959) was an international speedway rider from England.

Speedway career 
Hussey reached the final of the Speedway World Championship in the 1956 Individual Speedway World Championship.

He rode in the top tier of British Speedway, riding for various clubs. Hussey died on 6 March 1959, following a crash in a midget car race at Rowley Park Speedway in South Australia on March 6, 1959.

World Final Appearances

Individual World Championship
 1955 -  London, Wembley Stadium- Reserve - did not ride
 1956 -  London, Wembley Stadium - 16th - 0pts
 1958 -  London, Wembley Stadium - 9th - 7pts

References 

1933 births
1959 deaths
British speedway riders
West Ham Hammers riders
Norwich Stars riders
Leicester Hunters riders
Racing drivers who died while racing